South Esk may refer to:
The southern tributary of the River Esk, Lothian, Midlothian and East Lothian, Scotland
River South Esk, Angus, Scotland
South Esk River, Tasmania, Australia
South Esk Pine (Callitris oblonga), conifer found in Tasmania
South Esk Pine Reserve, Tasmania, Australia
South Esk, New Brunswick, town in New Brunswick, Canada

See also
River Esk (disambiguation)